John Dew may refer to:

 John Dew (cricketer), English cricketer
 John Dew (cardinal), Roman Catholic bishop and cardinal
 John Dew (director), British opera director